Fiona Beckett is a Bristol-based writer and food journalist who regularly writes for The Guardian, Decanter magazine, and other UK news publications. She has also written for The Times, The Daily Mail, The Telegraph, and National Geographic Food. She is a regular judge for competitions such as the BBC Food and Farming Awards, the Andre Simon Awards, and the Fortnum & Mason Awards.

Beckett has written 23 books about food and wine, including How to Match Food and Wine, Cooking with Wine, and Wine by Style. Beckett has been a contributing editor to Decanter since 1998 and since 2010 she has been a wine columnist for the Guardian.

Fiona Beckett has four children. Her son is Will Beckett, founder of the Hawksmoor restaurant chain. She has a BA in Philosophy & Politics from the University of Exeter.

Selected works
Eating and Drinking: an A-Z of Great Food & Drink Combinations (2000)
How to Match Food and Wine (2002)
Beyond Baked Beans, Absolute Press (2003)
Beyond Baked Beans Green, Absolute Press (2004)
Sausage and Mash, Absolute Press (2004)
Cooking with Wine (2005)
Beyond Baked Beans Budget, Absolute Press (2006)
Meat and Two Veg, Absolute Press (2006)
An Appetite for Ale, CAMRA Books (2007)
The Frugal Cook (2008)
Fiona Beckett's Cheese Course, Ryland Peters & Small Ltd (2009) 
The Ultimate Student Cookbook, Absolute Press, (2009)
The Frugal Cook, Absolute Press (2011)
The Healthy Lunchbox, Grub Street (2014)
 Winelover's Kitchen: Delicious Recipes for Cooking with Wine, Ryland Peters & Small Ltd, (2017)
 How to Drink without Drinking, Kyle (2019)

Awards
Food Journalist of the Year Award (2002), The Guild of Food Writers, for work in The Times, Decanter, Sainsbury's The Magazine
Blogger of the Year (2014), International Wine and Spirit Competition
Bookseller/Diagram Prize for Oddest Title of the Year (2019, currently nominated) for How to Drink without Drinking.

References

External links 
 Official site
 Fiona Beckett's Guardian columns
 Fiona Beckett's Decanter columns

English food writers
Living people
The Guardian journalists
Year of birth missing (living people)